Armand Pierre Angrand (9 October 1892 – 29 August 1964) was a Senegalese politician, nobleman and writer and mayor of Gorée and Dakar in 1934. Son of Leopold Angrand (1859–1906), descendant of a prominent Métis Signares Goree. Grand son of Pierre Angrand (1820 -?), a rich merchant and shipowner and Helene de Saint-Jean (1826–1859), granddaughter of Estoupan of St. John, who signed the capitulation of Gorée 1758 against the British.

He wrote a basic guide for the Europeans (French, Wolof Manual, foreword by Theodore Monod),. Armand-Pierre Angrand was also a correspondent in the Senegal Universal Negro Improvement Association (UNIA) movement founded by Marcus Garvey.

See also
 List of mayors of Dakar
 Timeline of Dakar

References

1892 births
1964 deaths
Mayors of Dakar
Mayors of places in Senegal
Senegalese politicians